The 1979 Sangguniang Pampook elections were held for the 2 Regional Legislative Assemblies or Sangguniang Pampook  on 7 May 1979, in the former Region IX (current Zamboanga Peninsula Region) and Region XII (current Soccsksargen Region).

Both were former Philippine Autonomous Regions located in areas of the Mindanao islands group in the southern Philippines.

Regional Legislative Assemblies - Sangguniang Pampook
Region IX and Region XII each had a Regional Legislative Assembly or Sangguniang Pampook, each composed of 18 representative each.
They included:
 17 representatives per region, elected from the different provinces and cities in each region.
 1 sectoral representative per region, selected from among the youth, agricultural workers, and non-agricultural workers (industrial labor) of each region. They were selected by qualifications that were the same as members of the Interim Batasang Pambansa.

Elections
The candidates for the 34 Regional Legislative Assembly representative positions, 17 each for Region IX and Region XII, were voted on at large by the registered voters of each province and city constituency. The candidates that received the highest number of votes in each constituency were declared their elected representative.

See also

References

1979 elections in the Philippines
Politics of Soccsksargen
Politics of Zamboanga Peninsula
Local elections in the Philippines
History of Mindanao